The Listing Rules (LR) are a set of regulations applicable to any company listed on a United Kingdom stock exchange, subject to the oversight of the Financial Conduct Authority (FCA). The Listing Rules set out mandatory standards for any company wishing to list its shares or securities for sale to the public, including principles on executive pay and the requirement to comply or explain noncompliance with the UK Corporate Governance Code, the requirements of information in a prospectus before an initial public offering of shares, new share offers, rights issues, disclosure of price sensitive information, or takeover bids for companies.

Overview
LR 1, Preliminary: All securities
LR 2, Requirements for listing: All securities
LR 3, Listing applications: All securities
LR 4, Listing particulars for professional securities market and certain other securities: All securities
LR 5, Suspending, cancelling and restoring listing: All securities
LR 6, Additional requirements for premium listing (commercial company)
LR 7, Listing principles: Premium listing
LR 8, Sponsors: Premium listing
LR 9, Continuing obligations
LR 10, Significant transactions: Premium listing
LR 11, Related party transactions: Premium listing
LR 12, Dealing in own securities and treasury shares: Premium listing
LR 13, Contents of circulars: Premium listing
LR 14, Standard listing (shares)
LR 15, Closed-ended investment funds: Premium listing
LR 16, Open-ended investment companies: Premium listing
LR 17, Debt and debt-like securities: Standard listing
LR 18, Certificates representing certain securities: Standard listing
LR 19, Securitised derivatives: Standard listing
LR 20, Miscellaneous securities: Standard listing
LR App 1, Relevant definitions
LR App 2, Fees and financial penalty income
LR App 3, List of regulatory information services
LR transchedule, Transitional Provisions

History
The London Stock Exchange has had a long tradition of self-regulation. Previous versions of the same kinds of rules were known as the rules on "Admission of Securities to Quotations" or "Admission of Securities to Listing".

In October 2010 the former UK Listing Authority operated as part of the Financial Services Authority, however after the FSA's abolition, it became part of the newly formed Financial Conduct Authority, and since 2017 the reference to the UKLA as a separate body has been phased out.

See also
UK company law
London Stock Exchange
US corporate law
NYSE Listed Company Manual (here)

Notes

External links
The Listing Rules, in the FSA Handbook
Historical Listing Rules at fsa.gov.uk

United Kingdom company law